Esbjerg forenede Boldklubber (commonly known as Esbjerg fB or EfB in short) is a Danish professional football club based in Esbjerg, West Jutland, that plays in the 2nd division, the third-tier of the Danish football league system. Founded in 1924 as a merger between Esbjerg Boldklub af 1898 and Esbjerg Amatørklub af 1911, the first team play their home games at Blue Water Arena which has been the club's home ground since its opening in 1955.

History

Early years

Esbjerg forenede Boldklubber was officially established in 1924 as a merger between Esbjerg Boldklub af 1898 (E.B. 98) and Esbjerg Amatørklub af 1911 (EAK) after 12 years of competition between the two clubs. The new club was driven by ambition for something bigger, which already produced results the day after when the club's best start-up team defeated Kolding IF with 7–0.

Golden years
The club's golden years were in the first half of the 1960s with the Austrian coach Rudi Strittich throughout most of the decade. The club won the Danish Championship in 1961, 1962, 1963 and 1965 and won the DBU Cup in 1964. This success has been largely attributed to Austrian coach Rudi Strittich, as well as strikers Jens Peter Hansen and Carl Emil Christiansen. In the championship season of 1961, Esbjerg set a stadium record with 20,000 spectators, as Esbjerg won the clash against KB 3–1 at home. In 1968, Esbjerg almost won another championship, when the team had the same amount of points as two other clubs before the last round, but despite winning the last match, KB won the title on goal difference. The following year, however, Esbjerg suffered relegation from the top tier, where they had played twenty seasons in a row.

In 1974, Esbjerg fB won promotion to the top division again, marking the beginning of the club's second golden era. Esbjerg won the DBU Cup again in 1976. In 1977, Strittich returned as coach, and with goalkeeper Ole Kjær and midfielder Jens Jørn Bertelsen as the driving forces in the following years, Esbjerg were back at the top. The club won bronze medals in 1977, and in 1978 Esbjerg fB lost the cup final to Frem after a penalty shootout and a total of three finals, all of which ended 1–1. Later that year, they achieved a second place finish in the top tier, while the team reached the third round of the UEFA Cup, where they beat Hertha BSC 2–1 in the first leg, but lost in the return match in Berlin by 4–0.

In 1979, Esbjerg fB won the club's fifth and most recent Danish championship. The following year, the team eliminated Halmstads BK in the European Champion Clubs' Cup. In the subsequent round, Esbjerg lost on the road with 3–0 to Spartak Moscow, but was in the return match, close to a sensation, Esbjerg won 2–0.

Ups and downs
In 1985, Esbjerg was close to winning the cup tournament, but lost in the final 3–2 to Lyngby on a goal shortly before the final whistle. Esbjerg relegated from the top tier in 1986 and in the early 1990s were down in the third division. In 1999, Esbjerg returned to the Danish Superliga. This time, their tenure in the top division was more permanent, achieving a third place finish in the 2003–04 season as their best performance, after being in first place with four rounds left. During that season, they broke records, causing Brøndby IF's largest home defeat ever, beating them 6–1 at Brøndby Stadium. In 2006 and 2008, the club reached the cup final. In the 2010–11 Danish Superliga season EfB finished 12th and were relegated to the Danish 1st Division for the first time since the 1999–2000 season.

Esbjerg returned to the Superliga in the 2012–13 season with success under head coach Jess Thorup, a former player for the club, as the team managed to win the Danish Cup for the third time in the club's history with a 1–0 victory against Randers FC, thus qualifying for European football. At the same time, they achieved a fourth place in the Superliga.

Frederiksen and European success
On 2 May 2013, the club announced that Niels Frederiksen would succeed Thorup as the club's head coach from the start of the 2013–14 Danish Superliga season. In the first season under Frederiksen, Esbjerg reached to the round of 32 in the Europa League, where they lost 4–2 over two legs to Italian side Fiorentina, despite winning 1–0 away at Stadio Artemio Franchi. This came after advancing from the group stage in second place by beating Standard Liège (2–1; 2–1) and Elfsborg (2–1; 1–0), and losing two matches to group winners, Red Bull Salzburg (2–1; 3–0). Esbjerg had qualified to the group stage after winning 5–3 on aggregate over French club Saint-Étienne. When the International Federation of Football History & Statistics (IFFHS) published their list of best clubs in the world, Esbjerg were in 79th place. Hans Henrik Andreasen was part of the autumn team in the Europa League among the best players in the tournament. In the domestic league, they also had a successful season, ending in fifth place which qualified the club for contention in the 2014–15 Europa League second round. 

In the following season, Esbjerg knocked out Kazakh side Kairat Almaty 2–1 on aggregate in the second qualifying round, before facing Polish club Ruch Chorzów in the third round. In the first leg, Esbjerg drew 0–0 away. However in the second leg, a last-minute goal by Łukasz Surma for Ruch Chorzów to make it 2–2 to win on away goals, ended Esbjerg's hopes of advancing in the tournament. In the domestic league, Esbjerg had sold key players such as Jakob Ankersen, Eddi Gomes and Martin Pušić during the winter transfer window, and partly due to this the club struggled against relegation. In the last fixture of the season, Esbjerg avoided relegation after a 2–1 win over relegation rivals, FC Vestsjælland.

On 10 August 2015, Frederiksen was dismissed by Esbjerg with the side placed last in the Danish Superliga table after four matches into the 2015–16 season, with chairman Søren Poulsen citing "lacking" domestic results as the reason behind the dismissal. Frederiksen was succeeded by Jonas Dal.

In 2017, Esbjerg moved out of the Superligaen after losing the decisive relegation final over two matches against AC Horsens by an aggregate score of 4–3. However, the club returned to the Superliga after just one season in the second tier. In the 2019–20 season, the club suffered another relegation after a tumultuous season.

New ownership, relegation, and controversies
From July 2020 to May 2021, Ólafur Kristjánsson was the head coach of the club. Earlier that season, in March 2021, Chien Lee, Partners Path Capital, Pacific Media Group and Krishen Sud invested in Esbjerg fB and became the majority shareholder. Thereby, the club became part of the same ownership group as Barnsley, Oostende and Nancy. The club failed promotion to the Superliga in the 2020–21 season, finishing in third place, 14 points from promotion spots. 

In May 2021, Peter Hyballa was hired as head coach of the club. Less than two months into his tenure, Danish newspaper B.T. reported that multiple Esbjerg players demanded his dismissal after "mental and physical punishments". The following day, Spillerforeningen, the Danish Player's Association, reprimanded the Esbjerg board after the American chairman Michael Kalt had toned down the conflict and informed JydskeVestkysten that only a few players were involved in the demand. One day later, Hyballa demoted four key players to the U19 team: Yuriy Yakovenko, Jakob Ankersen, Kevin Conboy and Zean Dalügge. On 15 July, Esbjerg fB were reported to the Danish Labour Inspection Authority ("Arbejdstilsynet") by Spillerforeningen after reports came out that Hyballa had allegedly hit and "mentally terrorised" players. The following week, Hyballa stated that he had never hit anyone, and that he had only tried to motivate his players.

On 24 July, Hyballa appointed the 19-year-old Mads Larsen as the new team captain. Three days later, on 27 July, new accusations arose against Hyballa – this time from Kasper Pedersen – who had terminated his contract by mutual consent the day before. He stated that Hyballa had created a "horrible mood" and that he had left the club due to the manager.

On 28 July 21 of Esbjerg's first-team players sent an open letter to club management, expressing "strong distrust" to Hyballa. The letter, which was also published in several media outlets, mentions several episodes where Hyballa had physically or mentally abused players. Responding to the letter, investor and spokesperson for the Esbjerg board, Paul Conway, stated to JydskeVestkysten that "[i]t's so unprofessional, I've never experienced anything like it. It can never be the players who get to decide who get to play and who is the coach."

On 11 August after weeks of stories in the press and a bad start to the season, Hyballa resigned as manager of Esbjerg and was replaced by Roland Vrabec. He was dismissed in March 2022 after seven months, as the club were mathematically out of reach of promotion. Rafael van der Vaart was appointed caretaker coach. On 18 March, in a 3–0 home loss to Lyngby, Esbjerg hooligans threw firecrackers onto the pitch and rioted after the game which resulted in multiple arrests, as the team were in a relegation battle. On May 18th 2022 Esbjerg lost 2-3 to Fremad Amager after blowing a 2-0 lead, and was for the first time in 28 years relegated to 2. division, the Danish 3rd tier, with 8 points to survival and only 2 matches left.

Stadium
 

Esbjerg fB plays at Blue Water Arena, which is the name of Esbjerg Stadion at Gl. Vardevej and part of Esbjerg Sports Park.

Honours

Danish Superliga
 Champions (5): 1961, 1962, 1963, 1965, 1979
 Silver (3): 1955–56, 1968, 1978
 Bronze (2): 1977, 2003–04, 2018–19

Danish Cup
 Winners (3): 1963–64, 1975–76, 2012–13
 Runners-up (6): 1956–57, 1961–62, 1977–78, 1984–85, 2005–06, 2007–08

Danish 1st Division
 Champions: 2011–12

Achievements
45 seasons in the Highest Danish League
24 seasons in the Second Highest Danish League
5 seasons in the Third Highest Danish League

Players

Current squad

Out on loan

Staff
 Head Coach: Lars Vind
 Assistant Coach: Rafael van der Vaart
 A + Coach: 
 Goalkeeper Coach: Frode Birkeland
 Transition Coach: Patrick Harboe
 Physical Coach: Morten Bastholm
 Assistant  Physical Coach: Mattias Fredeløkke
 Kit Manager: René Christiansen

Former coaches

 Rudi Strittich (1961–62)
 Arne Sørensen (1963–64)
 Rudi Strittich (1965–67)
 Richard Møller Nielsen (1968–69)
 Ernst Netuka (1969–70)
 Ludwig Weg (1970–71)
 Peter Stubbe (1972)
 JJ Hansen and  CE Christiansen (1972)
 Egon Jensen (1973–76)
 Rudi Strittich (1976–79)
 Carl Emil Christiansen (1979–80)
 Jürgen Wähling (1981–83)
 Henrik Brandenborg (1984–86)
 Allan Michaelsen (1987–88)
 Allan Hebo Larsen (1989–90)
  Jan Hansen (1990–93)
 Ian Salter (1993)
 Jørn Bach (1993–97)
 Viggo Jensen (1997–02)
 Ove Pedersen (1 July 2002 – 31 December 2005)
 Troels Bech (1 July 2005 – 16 November 2008)
 Jess Thorup (17 November 2008 – 31 December 2008)
 Ove Pedersen (1 January 2009 – 14 March 2011)
 Jess Thorup (14 March 2011 – 30 May 2013)
 Niels Frederiksen (1 July 2013 – 10 August 2015)
 Michael Mex Pedersen (11 August 2015 – 20 October 2015)
 Jonas Dal (20 October 2015 – 30 June 2016)
 Colin Todd (8 July 2016 – 5 December 2016)
 Lars Lungi Sørensen (5 December 2016 – 19 June 2017)
 John Lammers (23 June 2017 – 16 September 2019)
 Claus Nørgaard (17 September 2019 – 27 October 2019)
 Lars Olsen (28 October 2019 – 9 June 2020)
 Troels Bech (10 June 2020 – 15 July 2020)
 Ólafur Kristjánsson (1 August 2020 – 10 May 2021)
 Lars Vind (10 May 2021 – 30 May 2021)
 Peter Hyballa (1 June 2021 – 11 August 2021)
 Roland Vrabec (11 August 2021 – 9 March 2022)
 Rafael van der Vaart (10 March 2022 – 30 March 2022)
 Michael Kryger (30 March 2022 – 20 April 2022)
 Steffen Ernemann (20 April 2022 – 30 June 2022)
 Lars Vind (1 July 2022 – present)

Denmark national football team players
The following 32 Esbjerg football players has been picked and had their debut on the Danish national football team (debut/matches/goals):

 Peter Ankersen (2013/1/0)
 Martin Braithwaite (2013/2/1)
 Peter Nymann (2010/1/0)
 Søren Rieks (2009/3/1)
 Martin Vingaard (2008/5/1)
 Niki Zimling (2008/1/0)
 Jesper Bech (2006/1/0)
 Jan Kristiansen (2003/9/0)
 John Lauridsen (1981/27/3)
 Ole Madsen (1980/18/0)
 Ole Kjær (1977/26/0)
 Jens Jørn Bertelsen (1976/69/2)
 Hans Jørgen Christiansen (1968/5/0)
 Vagn Hedeager (1967/1/0)
 Børge Enemark (1965/11/0)
 Knud Petersen (1965/4/0)
 Preben Jensen (1962/2/0)
 Carl Emil Christiansen (1962/2/1)
 Jens Petersen (1962/22/1)
 Jens Jørgen Hansen (1962/40/0)
 Carl Bertelsen (1962/21/9)
 Erik Gaardhøje (1961/14/0)
 John Madsen (1961/20/0)
 Egon Jensen (1957/12/4)
 Ove Hansen (1956/9/0)
 Johannes Schmidt (1955/1/0)
 Søren Andersen (1951/5/0)
 Erik Terkelsen (1950/17/0)
 Jens Peder Hansen (1949/38/18)
 Curt Christensen (1949/1/0)
 Viggo Jensen (1945/15/1)
 Jørgen Iversen (1937/5/1)
 Olaf Brockhoff (1935/2/0)
 Arthur Nielsen (1935/1/0)
 Emil Møller (1932/3/0)

Former notable foreign players
Esbjerg has a list of former notable foreign players of which some have represented their national team. Some of the most memorable are listed here:

 Lukáš Hrádecký
 Michaël Murcy
 Njogu Demba-Nyrén
 Kolja Afriyie
 Kostas Tsimikas
 Kári Árnason
 Arnór Smárason
 Igors Stepanovs
 Fernando Derveld
 Tim Janssen
 Rafael van der Vaart
 Martin Dúbravka
 Fredrik Berglund
 Christian Karlsson
 Andreas Klarström
 Alexander Östlund
 Joakim Persson
 Erik Wahlstedt

Player of the Year

Player of the year Esbjerg fB
 1999–00: Henrik Ibsen
 2000–01: Joakim Persson
 2001–02: Christian Karlsson
 2002–03: Jan Kristiansen
 2003–04: Tommy Bechmann
 2004–05: Fredrik Berglund
 2005–06: Jerry Lucena
 2006–07: Niki Zimling
 2007–08: Martin Vingaard
 2008–09: Søren Rieks
 2009–10: Nicolai Høgh
 2010–11: Jesper Lange
 2011–12: Søren Rieks
 2012–13: Lukáš Hrádecký
 2013–14: Kian Hansen
 2014–15: Jonas Knudsen
 2015–16: Jeppe Højbjerg
 2016–17: Victor Pálsson
 2017–18: Anders Dreyer
 2018–19: Joni Kauko
 2019–20: Rodolph Austin
 2020–21: Mads Kikkenborg

Player of the /ear Denmark
 1963: Jens Petersen
 1978: Ole Kjær
 1979: Jens Jørn Bertelsen

Recent history

References

External links

Official website (in Danish)

 
Football clubs in Denmark
Association football clubs established in 1924
1924 establishments in Denmark